Diallus gebehensis is a species of beetle in the family Cerambycidae. It was described by Stephan von Breuning in 1957. It is known from Moluccas.

References

Lamiini
Beetles described in 1957
Taxa named by Stephan von Breuning (entomologist)